Travels Through France and Italy is travel literature by Tobias Smollett published in 1766.

After suffering the loss of his only child, 15-year-old Elizabeth, in April 1763, Smollett left England in June of that year. Together with his wife, he travelled across France to Nice. In the autumn of the next year, he visited Genoa, Rome, Florence and other towns of Italy. After staying in Nice for the winter he returned to London by June 1765. Travels Through France and Italy is his account of this journey.

Smollett describes in great detail the natural phenomena, history, social life, economics, diet and morals of the places he visited. Smollett had a lively and pertinacious curiosity, and, as his novels prove, a very quick eye. He foresaw the merits of Cannes, then a small village, as a health-resort, and the possibilities of the Corniche road.

The writing is often characterized by spleen, acerbity and quarrelsomeness. Smollett quarrels with innkeepers, postilions and fellow travellers, and holds many (though by no means all) foreigners he meets in contempt. He derides the Roman Catholic faith, duelling, petty and proud nobility, such domestic arrangements as the cicisbeo (an 'approved' lover of a married woman), and many other French and Italian customs.

Laurence Sterne, who met Smollett in Italy, satirized Smollett's jaundiced attitude in the character of Smelfungus in A Sentimental Journey Through France and Italy, which was written in part as an answer to Smollett's book.

References

Sources and external links

Travels through France and Italy, volume XI of The Works of Tobias Smollett, edited by William Ernest Henley, Scribner's sons, 1900. Introduction by Thomas Seccombe. From Google Books.
Frank Felsenstein, ed. (1999), Travels through France and Italy, Oxford World's Classics, . Introduction. 60 pages of footnotes.

1766 books
British travel books
Scottish non-fiction books
Books about France
Books about Italy